Continental Connection was a brand name under which several commuter airline carriers and their holding companies operated services marketed exclusively by Continental Airlines. As such, all Continental Connection banner carrier services were operated primarily with turboprop aircraft in contrast to Continental Express, whose flights were operated by Continental's regional jet partners, ExpressJet Airlines and Chautauqua Airlines.  Continental Connection operations were merged into Continental Express in 2012.

According to the Official Airline Guide, earlier Continental Express flights, such as those operated by Royale Airlines followed by Britt Airways from the Continental hub at Houston Intercontinental Airport (IAH), were operated with such turboprop aircraft as the ATR-42, Embraer EMB-110 Bandeirante, Embraer EMB-120 Brasilia, and Grumman Gulfstream I during the 1980s.

All flights operated by Continental Connection carriers were given full OnePass frequent-flyer credit, as if they were mainline Continental flights.

The "Continental Connection" name was discontinued and the operation was renamed United Express following the merger of Continental Airlines with United Airlines.

Operators and fleet

Incidents and accidents

 On February 12, 2009, Colgan Air Flight 3407 operating on behalf of Continental Connection crashed into a house on Long Road in Clarence Center, New York while on approach to Buffalo Niagara International Airport; 50 people, including one on the ground, were killed according to New York State Police.
 On September 7, 2011, Colgan Air Flight 3222, with 23 passengers en route from Houston, TX to Lake Charles, LA landed at Southland Field, which was not their scheduled destination. The crew was subsequently relieved of duty.

See also 
 List of defunct airlines of the United States

References

Defunct airlines of the United States
Airlines established in 1986
Airlines disestablished in 2012
Defunct regional airline brands
Former SkyTeam affiliate members
Former Star Alliance affiliate members
Airlines based in Texas